The 2020 Iga Świątek tennis season officially began on 20 January 2020 as the start of the 2020 WTA Tour. Iga Świątek entered the season as world number 59 in singles. The season saw the Polish player won the French Open.

All matches

Singles matches

Doubles matches

Mixed doubles matches

Tournament schedule

Singles schedule

Doubles schedule

Mixed doubles schedule

Yearly records

Top 10 wins

Singles

Finals

Singles: 1 (1 title)

Earnings

References

External links

 
 
 

2020 in Polish tennis
2020 tennis player seasons
Iga Świątek tennis seasons